Vuela Aviacion S.A., operating as Volaris Costa Rica, is a low-cost airline based at Juan Santamaría International Airport in San José, Costa Rica. It is a subsidiary of Mexican airline Volaris. Announced in March 2016, the airline began operations in November with flights to Guatemala City.

History
Parent company Volaris announced the creation of Volaris Costa Rica in March 2016, at which point the subsidiary was already nearing the end of certification with Costa Rican officials. Volaris confirmed in November 2016 that its Costa Rican subsidiary had obtained its air operator's certificate. Volaris Costa Rica operated its first flight from its San José base to Guatemala City on November 30, 2016, using an Airbus A320-200 wet leased from Volaris. The airline's initial area of focus is flights within Central America.

Corporate affairs
Volaris Costa Rica is a subsidiary of Mexican airline Volaris and operates as a low-cost carrier. The airline's chief executive officer is Fernando Naranjo.

Destinations
The airline flies to the following destinations as of February 2023:

Fleet

Current fleet
Volaris Costa Rica flies the following aircraft as of March 2023:

Former fleet
Volaris Costa Rica formerly operated the following aircraft:

See also
List of airlines of Costa Rica
List of low-cost airlines

References

External links

Airlines of Costa Rica
Airlines established in 2016
Low-cost carriers